WMOR-TV (channel 32) is an independent television station licensed to Lakeland, Florida, United States, serving the Tampa Bay area. Owned by Hearst Television, the station maintains studios on Hillsborough Avenue in east Tampa, and its transmitter is located in Riverview. Master control and some internal operations are based at the studios of Orlando NBC affiliate WESH (channel 2) on North Wymore Road in Eatonville.

WMOR-TV is the only television station owned by Hearst that is not affiliated with any major broadcast network, as well as the only Hearst station that does not maintain a news department. Despite Lakeland being WMOR-TV's city of license, the station has no physical presence there.

History
The station first signed on the air on April 24, 1986 as WTMV; branded as "V-32", it originally maintained an all-music video format. The station's owner and general manager was Dan Johnson, former mayor of St. Petersburg Beach, who previously owned the old WXCR-FM classical music radio station in nearby Safety Harbor. The station originally operated from studio facilities located on South Florida Avenue/SR 37 on the south side of Lakeland, with its transmitter near Mulberry in southwestern Polk County.

After a brief period of broadcasting from the transmitter in Mulberry, WTMV relocated its studio operations to its present-day studios in Tampa in 1988. The facility had been a former headend office for Group W Cable's Hillsborough County system. Around this time, it transitioned to a conventional general entertainment format, filling a void left by WFTS-TV's switch to Fox. It aired a schedule of off-network and syndicated sitcoms and dramas, game shows, movies and cartoons. It also picked up several network programs from ABC, NBC and CBS that Tampa Bay's Big Three affiliates (WTSP channel 10, now with CBS; WFLA-TV channel 8; and WTVT channel 13, now with Fox) as well as those from Orlando (WFTV channel 9; WESH; WCPX, now WKMG-TV, channel 6) chose to preempt.

WTMV became Tampa Bay's WB affiliate when that network launched on January 11, 1995, branding itself as "WB 32". By that point, it ran cartoons (such as Scooby-Doo, Biker Mice from Mars, Captain Planet and the Planeteers, The Jetsons and The Flintstones), sitcoms (such as Doogie Howser, M.D., Blossom, The Wonder Years and Too Close for Comfort), talk shows (such as The Richard Bey Show), reality shows (such as Check It Out!) and movies. Johnson sold the station to Hearst Television in 1996, with the station's callsign being changed to WWWB-TV (in reference to its affiliation with The WB) following the finalization of the purchase on September 18.

In September 1999, WWWB lost its WB affiliation to WTTA (channel 38), as a result of a larger nationwide deal between The WB and the Sinclair Broadcast Group's UPN affiliates and independent stations (Kansas City sister station KCWB also lost its WB affiliation to a Sinclair station, KSMO-TV, now owned by Gray Television) one year earlier. WWWB changed its call letters to WMOR-TV on September 1 that year and rebranded itself as "More TV 32"—a moniker also adopted by its Kansas City sister (now known as KCWE). In August 2008, the "More TV 32" branding was dropped for the simplified "TV 32". On April 4, 2011, the station's on-air brand was changed to "MOR". To distance itself from the earlier "More TV" branding, the station spells out "MOR", instead of saying it as a word; however, it's still inferred as "more", through its slogan, "Just Can't Get Enough? Get MOR!".

On July 9, 2012, WMOR's parent company Hearst Television became involved in a dispute with Time Warner Cable and Bright House Networks, leading to WMOR being pulled from Bright House and temporarily replaced with HBO Family on the main WMOR channel and This TV, with InfoMás in Estrella TV's slot. The substitutions lasted until July 19, 2012, when a new carriage deal was reached between Hearst and Time Warner Cable.

Programming
Syndicated programming seen on WMOR-TV as of September 2020 includes The Big Bang Theory, Tamron Hall, The Kelly Clarkson Show, The Good Dish, The Goldbergs, Modern Family, and The Steve Wilkos Show among others.

Sports programming
WWWB/WMOR was the original television broadcaster of the Tampa Bay Devil Rays when it began Major League Baseball play in 1998. Before that, as WTMV, it showed occasional telecasts of Toronto Blue Jays games, including Nolan Ryan's seventh career no-hitter in 1991, to accommodate the Tampa Bay area's unique population of Canadian snowbirds in the days before MLB Extra Innings and MLB.tv came to prominence.

WMOR currently serves as the local over-the-air broadcaster of ESPN Monday Night Football games involving the Tampa Bay Buccaneers, airing simulcasts of ESPN-televised games (Hearst holds a 20% ownership stake in ESPN; the network's remaining ownership interest is held by The Walt Disney Company), and the company has right of first refusal for simulcasts of ESPN's NFL telecasts in a team's home market. WMOR, along with WFTS which airs the Buccaneers' preseason and Thursday Night Football games (the latter through Amazon Prime Video), are the only Tampa Bay stations that air selected Buccaneers games without having weekly NFL coverage: the team's local preseason and NBC appearances air on WFLA-TV, their CBS appearances air on WTSP and their Fox appearances air on WTVT.

WMOR announced on March 9, 2017 that they would be the Tampa Bay Rowdies' exclusive broadcast partners for the upcoming United Soccer League season. All USL home games were broadcast live and in primetime on channel 32.2 thisTV Tampa Bay.

Technical information

Subchannels

This TV was added to digital subchannel 32.2 in March 2009. It was followed by the launch of Estrella TV in September 2009 on subchannel 32.3. On September 26, 2019, MeTV was added to subchannel 32.2, replacing This TV.

ATSC 3.0 lighthouse

Analog-to-digital conversion
WMOR-TV shut down its Mulberry analog transmitter, over UHF channel 32, on June 12, 2009, as part of the federally mandated transition from analog to digital television. The station's digital signal, originating from the market's antenna farm in Riverview, remained on its pre-transition UHF channel 19, using PSIP to display WMOR-TV's virtual channel as 32 on digital television receivers.

Former repeaters
Prior to the end of analog broadcasting for full-power stations in the United States, WMOR operated three repeaters in the Tampa Bay area. Hence, the repeaters were necessary to reach as much of the most-populated areas as possible. This was not as much of a problem for the station from the 1990s onward, as cable gained greater penetration in the area. The station's former translators were:

The translators were shut down between September 2000 and June 2009, as WMOR's digital signal operates at a full million watts—equivalent to 5 million watts for an analog transmitter—and is more than sufficient to cover the entire market. WMOR's digital transmitter is also located at the market's antenna farm in Riverview, in central Hillsborough County, where all of the market's television stations except Sarasota-based WWSB have their transmitters, further making the repeaters redundant.

References

External links
MOR-TV.com - WMOR-TV official website
MeTV.com - MeTV Tampa Bay official website

Independent television stations in the United States
Television channels and stations established in 1986
1986 establishments in Florida
MeTV affiliates
Estrella TV affiliates
MOR-TV
Hearst Television
ATSC 3.0 television stations
Lakeland, Florida